is a Japanese ice sledge hockey player. He was part of the Japanese sledge hockey team that won a silver medal at the 2010 Winter Paralympics.

When he was in high school, his right leg was amputated above the knee following a bone cancer diagnosis.

References

External links 
 
 

1971 births
Living people
Japanese sledge hockey players
Paralympic sledge hockey players of Japan
Paralympic silver medalists for Japan
Ice sledge hockey players at the 2006 Winter Paralympics
Ice sledge hockey players at the 2010 Winter Paralympics
Para ice hockey players at the 2018 Winter Paralympics
Medalists at the 2010 Winter Paralympics
People from Musashino, Tokyo
Sportspeople from Tokyo
Japanese amputees
Paralympic medalists in sledge hockey